Sołtmany is an L6 ordinary chondrite meteorite which fell on 30 April 2011 in Sołtmany village, Poland. The fall occurred at around 6:00 am. A single meteorite penetrated the edge of a roof and shattered on concrete floor into several pieces. It was immediately found by the owners of the farm, alarmed by the loud noise.

See also
 Glossary of meteoritics
 Meteorite fall

External links
 Meteorical Bulletin Database: Sołtmany

Meteorites found in Poland
2011 in Poland